Dwight Foster is the name of:

Dwight Foster (politician, born 1757) (1757–1823), U.S. Congressman and Senator for Massachusetts
Dwight Foster (politician, born 1828) (1828–1884), Massachusetts attorney general
Dwight Foster (ice hockey) (born 1957), ice hockey player in the NHL